The New Hampshire Department of Labor (DOL) is a government agency of the U.S. state of New Hampshire. Based in Concord, the agency works to protect the "interests and dignity" of workers in the state. The department was established by state statute in 1893, and its first commissioner was appointed that year.

Structure
The department has a Workers' Compensation Division and an Inspection Division. There are also several boards and councils:
 State Apprenticeship Advisory Council
 Workers' Compensation Appeals Board
 Workers' Compensation Appeals Advisory Board
 Workers' Compensation Advisory Council
 Vocational Rehabilitation Board

The department is authorized as provided in New Hampshire Revised Statutes Annotated (NH RSA) Chapter 273.

References

External links

Labor
1893 establishments in New Hampshire
Government agencies established in 1893
State departments of labor of the United States